HMS Charles Galley was a 32–gun fifth rate of the Royal Navy built at Woolwich Dockyard and launched in 1676. She was rebuilt in 1693, and again at Deptford Dockyard in 1710. She was renamed HMS Torrington after a third rebuild in 1729, and was hulked in 1740. She was finally sold on 12 July 1744.

Notes

References

External links
 

Frigates of the Royal Navy
1670s ships
Ships built in Woolwich